Fern Fitzgerald (born January 7, 1947 in Valley Stream, New York) is an American actress, best known for her recurring role as oil cartel businesswoman Marilee Stone in the CBS primetime soap opera Dallas from 1979 to 1989. She guest-starred in the number of other television series, like Archie Bunker's Place, Hill Street Blues, Hotel, Who's the Boss?, Life Goes On, and Seinfeld. In film, Fitzgerald appeared in The Beach Girls (1982). She also appeared in the original productions of Chicago and A Chorus Line on Broadway.

Filmography

All My Children (1978)
A Cry for Love as Barbara (1980)
Too Close for Comfort as Masseuse (1 episode, 1980)
Hart to Hart as Female Passenger (1 episode, 1981)
The Beach Girls as Julie (1982)
Madame's Place as Rhoda Royale (1 episode, 1982)
Archie Bunker's Place as Pat McBride (3 episodes, 1983)
Hill Street Blues (1 episode, 1983)
Silver Spoons as Corinne Taylor (2 episodes, 1983—1984)
Stingray as Marcia Finch (1985)
Scarecrow and Mrs. King as Jill Halsman (1 episode, 1985)
It's a Living as Louise (1 episode, 1986)
Hotel as Myra Fields (1 episode, 1986)
Who's the Boss? as Dr. Isabel Schaeffer (2 episodes, 1985—1986)
Hunter as Shelly Kurtz (1 episode, 1987)
The Oldest Rookie as Karen (1 episode, 1987)
Who Gets the Friends? (1988)
Nightingales (1988)
Hooperman (1 episode, 1989)
Dallas as Marilee Stone (73 episodes, 1979–1987, 1989)
They Came from Outer Space as Ramona (1 episode, 1990)
Shades of L.A. as Katherine (1 episode, 1991)
Life Goes On as Robin Benchfield (3 episodes, 1990—1992)
Vanishing Son (1 episode, 1995)
Seinfeld as Ms. Wilkie (1 episode, 1996)

References

External links
 

1947 births
Actresses from New York (state)
American musical theatre actresses
American soap opera actresses
Living people
People from Long Island
American television actresses
20th-century American actresses
Valley Stream Central High School alumni
21st-century American women